Vadym Sapay (born 7 February 1986 in Yuzhnoukrainsk, Mykolaiv Oblast, Ukrainian SSR) is a professional retired Ukrainian football defender.

He joined Vorskla Poltava in the summer transfer season of 2012 from Obolon Kyiv.

References 

Profile on Official Metalurh Donetsk Website
Profile on Football Squads

1986 births
Living people
People from Yuzhnoukrainsk
Ukrainian footballers
FC Borysfen Boryspil players
FC Borysfen-2 Boryspil players
FC Systema-Boreks Borodianka players
FC Metalurh Donetsk players
FC Stal Alchevsk players
FC Obolon-Brovar Kyiv players
FC Vorskla Poltava players
Ukrainian Premier League players
Association football midfielders
Sportspeople from Mykolaiv Oblast